The list of companies listed on the Toronto Stock Exchange is divided by initial:
Companies listed on the Toronto Stock Exchange (0-9)
Companies listed on the Toronto Stock Exchange (A)
Companies listed on the Toronto Stock Exchange (B)
Companies listed on the Toronto Stock Exchange (C)
Companies listed on the Toronto Stock Exchange (D)
Companies listed on the Toronto Stock Exchange (E)
Companies listed on the Toronto Stock Exchange (F)
Companies listed on the Toronto Stock Exchange (G)
Companies listed on the Toronto Stock Exchange (H)
Companies listed on the Toronto Stock Exchange (I)
Companies listed on the Toronto Stock Exchange (J)
Companies listed on the Toronto Stock Exchange (K)
Companies listed on the Toronto Stock Exchange (L)
Companies listed on the Toronto Stock Exchange (M)
Companies listed on the Toronto Stock Exchange (N)
Companies listed on the Toronto Stock Exchange (O)
Companies listed on the Toronto Stock Exchange (P)
Companies listed on the Toronto Stock Exchange (Q)
Companies listed on the Toronto Stock Exchange (R)
Companies listed on the Toronto Stock Exchange (S)
Companies listed on the Toronto Stock Exchange (T)
Companies listed on the Toronto Stock Exchange (U)
Companies listed on the Toronto Stock Exchange (V)
Companies listed on the Toronto Stock Exchange (W)
Companies listed on the Toronto Stock Exchange (X)
Companies listed on the Toronto Stock Exchange (Y)
Companies listed on the Toronto Stock Exchange (Z)